Charles Gardiner (7 April 1915 – 1973) was a Scottish professional footballer who played in the Football League for Mansfield Town and Nottingham Forest.

References

1915 births
1973 deaths
Scottish footballers
Association football forwards
English Football League players
Nottingham Forest F.C. players
Montrose F.C. players
Mansfield Town F.C. players